WSSX-FM (95.1 FM, "95SX") is a Top 40 (CHR) radio station located in Charleston, South Carolina. The station is licensed by the Federal Communications Commission (FCC) to broadcast with an effective radiated power (ERP) of 100 kW. The station is owned by Cumulus Media.  Its studios are located in North Charleston and the transmitter tower is located in Mount Pleasant.

History
95.1 originally signed on June 2, 1947 as WTMA-FM, the sister to WTMA AM 1250. By the late 1950s, WTMA-FM was simulcasting much of the AM's programming full-time, which was Top 40 by that point.

When the FCC started to limit simulcasts of AM and FM stations in the late 1960s, WTMA-FM became WPXI in 1972 with an automated "beautiful music" format. In 1975, WPXI changed to urban contemporary as "Super 95 Soul". Although it was still automated, it was noted as being one of the few commercial urban FMs in South Carolina at the time.

In 1981, WPXI dropped the urban format as the station became WSSX, with a Top 40/AOR hybrid known as contemporary hit radio. Their slogan was "We Are The Rock 'N' Roll Station. The All New 95 FM WSSX", the station went to #1 in the ratings within a year. By 1983, the station had transitioned to a fully-fledged mainstream CHR radio station under their nickname "Hitradio The All New 95SX FM", again going #1 on several occasions throughout the remainder of the 1980s.

By 1993, WSSX's ratings had begun to decline as the station shifted away from CHR to hot adult contemporary as "The New 95 Mix", then later changed to Mix 95.1. This lasted until September 1995 when the station returned to their CHR roots and their iconic nickname "95SX". Iconic DJ Danger Dan (Elm) was an integral part of 95SX in the mid 1990s.

In October 2007, following sister WSUY's flip from mainstream AC to country, the station invited listeners from the station to tune to 95.1FM saying "Welcome 96.9 Listeners." 

As of January 2010, WSSX, whose direction favored adults and at times took a conservative approach by playing Hot AC or Pop/Rock artists, has begun to shift towards a Rhythmic-leaning direction, as it now favors Rhythmic Pop acts. This move might be due to a changing taste in its listeners' musical choices and its decision to attract a younger demo.  The station's main competitor, Apex Broadcasting's WIHB, switched to a hip hop format in March 2010.  This leaves WSSX as the only CHR station in the market.

Their official station mascot is the 95SX's Party Parrot.

References

External links
Official station website

SSX-FM
Contemporary hit radio stations in the United States
Cumulus Media radio stations
Radio stations established in 1945
1945 establishments in South Carolina